Armeria maritima, the thrift, sea thrift or sea pink, is a species of flowering plant in the family Plumbaginaceae. It is a compact evergreen perennial which grows in low clumps and sends up long stems that support globes of bright pink flowers. In some cases purple, white or red flowers also occur. It is a popular garden flower and has been distributed worldwide as a garden and cut flower.  It does well in gardens designed as xeriscapes or rock gardens. The Latin specific epithet maritima means pertaining to the sea or coastal.

Subspecies 
 Armeria maritima subsp. azorica, Franco
 Armeria maritima subsp. californica, synonym: California Seapink
Armeria maritima subsp. elongata,  synonym: Tall Thrift, Gaston Bonnier.
Armeria maritima subsp. maritima
Armeria maritima subsp. purpurea, synonym: Armeria purpurea W.D.J.Koch, (W.D.J.Koch) Á.Löve and D.Löve
Armeria maritima subsp. sibirica, synonym: Siberian Sea Thrift, Turczaninow ex Boissier

Distribution and habitat

Armeria maritima sensu lato has a circumpolar distribution can be found in the wild in coastal areas across the Northern Hemisphere. It can grow in dry, sandy, saline conditions such as coastal cliffs, grassland and salt marshes, salted roadsides and inland on mountain rocks. It is a common sight in British salt marshes, where it flowers April to October.

Armeria maritima has a great copper-tolerance, and is able to grow in soils with copper concentrations of up to 6400 mg/kg.  One mechanism proposed is that not much copper is transported up the shoot of the plant, and is excreted from decaying leaves. Some of the physiology and metabolism of this species has been described, of particular note is how the metabolism of this species is altered with elevated atmospheric carbon dioxide concentrations.

Ecology
Pollination is by various insects including bees and Lepidoptera.

It is a known host species to the pathogenic fungus Phoma herbarum.

Conservation
Armeria maritima is a common species in the UK, however there are several subspecies and in England, subspecies elongata (Tall Thrift) has vulnerable conservation status and is designated as a species of principal importance for biodiversity conservation under the NERC Act (2006).

Cultivation
The cultivar 'Vindictive' has gained the Royal Horticultural Society's Award of Garden Merit.

In popular culture

The British threepence coin issued between 1937 and 1952 had a design of thrift on the reverse. In British slang, thrifty means to have bought a lot for very little money and the phrase is though to be the reason why thrift was used as the emblem for the threepence coin (not worth very much money).

As part of a 2002 marketing campaign, the plant conservation charity Plantlife chose sea thrift as the county flower of the Isles of Scilly.

Thrift was mentioned in Sir John Betjeman's poem 'A Bay in Anglesea'.

Pink Thrift was a memorable part of the description of Kirrin Castle around which many of the adventures of Enid Blyton's Famous Five took place: "The  coarse  green  grass  sprang  everywhere, and pink thrift grew its cushions in holes and crannies."

References

External links

Jepson Manual Treatment
Photo gallery
Wildlife Trusts - Thrift

maritima
Flora of North America
Garden plants of North America
Flora of Europe
Flora of South America
Plants described in 1809